Stagnicola corvus is a species of air-breathing freshwater snail, an aquatic pulmonate gastropod mollusk in the family Lymnaeidae, the pond snails.

Distribution
This species is found in the Czech Republic, Slovakia, Germany, Poland, the Netherlands and other areas.

Biotope 
This species inhabits bodies of freshwater.

References

Lymnaeidae
Gastropods described in 1791
Taxa named by Johann Friedrich Gmelin